Chaali Polilu is a Tulu language film directed by Virendra Shetty Kavoor starring Devadas Kapikad, Naveen D Padil and Bhojaraj Vamanjoor in lead roles. Chaali Polilu is produced under the banner of Jayakirana films by Prakash Pandeshwar.The film has shared valuable message to the society. The film completely reflects upon social evils in the society and also provides equal amount of entertainment to the audience. and became a highest grossing Tulu film of all time.

"The film has successfully completed 511 days in PVR Cinemas which is the all time record in July Cinema".

Plot
The first half of the film tells about the three main characters Pandu (Devadas Kapikad), Damu (Naveen D Padil) and Manju (Bhojaraj Vamanjoor). They are best friends from childhood and stay in same neighbourhood. They are naughty and are not interested in studies at all. They are jobless and do not do any work. The trio are called 'Chaali Polilu' by the people in the area.

Everything seems to be going on fine in their life until one day they are accused of stealing the ornaments from the sanctum sanctorum in the village temple. Will they come out of the problem? How will they solve the problem? All this is shown in the second half.

Cast
Devadas Kapikad as Pandu
Naveen D Padil as Damu
Bhojaraj Vamanjoor as Manju
Divyashree
Aravind Bolar as Babanna. 
Navya
Arjun Kapikad (Guest appearance)
Sunder Rai 
Chethan Rai 
Padmaja Rao
Prasanna Shetty
Prajwal Pandeshwar
Deepak Balan
Prajnesh shetty
Dithesh Poojary
Brijesh Garodi
Ravindra Shetty Kuthethure
Jaganaath Shetty Bala

Soundtrack
The soundtracks of the film were composed by V.Manohar. Music released by Muzik247 Tulu

Boxoffice Collection
Chaali Polilu has crossed Rs one crore in box office
collections in just three weeks, breaking all previous box office records. The film has so far collected around ₹2 crores at Boxoffice.

Awards
Tulu Cinemotsava Awards 2015
Best Film 
Best Director- Virendra Shetty Kavoor
Best Actor - Naveen D Padil
Best Actress - Divyashree
Best Actor in a Negative Role- Chethan Rai
Best Music Director - V.Manohar 
Best Editor - P C Mohanan
Best Choreography- Cool Jayanth

References

External links
 
http://www.daijiworld.com/news/news_disp.asp?n_id=240187 "
https://web.archive.org/web/20141109130209/http://www.themangaloretimes.com/news/chali-polilu-tulu-film-to-hit-big-screen-this-month

https://web.archive.org/web/20141113152331/http://www.udayavanienglish.com/news/533683L14-First-time-ever-in-history-of-Tulu-cinema--Chaali-Polilu-tickets-being-sold-in-black-.html
http://www.daijiworld.com/news/news_disp.asp?n_id=278812 
http://www.daijiworld.com/news/news_disp.asp?n_id=294091 
https://web.archive.org/web/20150715164425/http://seeandsaynews.in/tulunadu/mangaluru/6782-chaali-polilu-crew-felicitated-by-tulu-sahitya-academy

2014 films
Films scored by V. Manohar